Edwin Ernesto Rivera Gracias (born July 4, 1984 or July 4, 1988) is a Salvadoran criminal who was a former FBI Ten Most Wanted Fugitive he surrendered to the police in El Salvador on March 27, 2013.

Background
Rivera Gracias was wanted for first-degree murder in the stabbing death of a 63-year-old Denver resident on August 17, 2011, after which he became sought by the police. He was later added to the FBI's 'Ten Most Wanted' list on March 14, 2013, and was apprehended when he was spotted and arrested in San Salvador, El Salvador on March 27, 2013, after surrendering to avoid an altercation.

References

1980s births
2011 murders in the United States
Fugitives
Living people
Male murderers